The Emerson–Holmes Building is a historic building at 566 Mulberry Street in Macon, Georgia that was built in 1859. It was added to the National Register of Historic Places in 1971.

It is narrow—just —and was built to serve as dentist offices for Dr. George W. Emerson, a dentist from Hew Hampshire.  It has a "distinctive" facade and interior designed by master builder James B. Ayres and possibly built by artisans from Italy who had been brought to built the P.L. Hay House.  The building was used for 82 years as dentist offices by Dr. Emerson and successors.  The building also has residential space on the third floor.

Another NRHP listed building, the Militia Headquarters Building, was immediately adjacent to this building, but has since been demolished.

Photos
The building was surveyed by the Historic American Buildings Survey program, the photos were taken by L.D. Andrew on August 2, 1936.

See also
National Register of Historic Places listings in Bibb County, Georgia

References

External links

Commercial buildings on the National Register of Historic Places in Georgia (U.S. state)
Buildings and structures in Macon, Georgia
Buildings and structures completed in 1859
1859 establishments in Georgia (U.S. state)